The Metopininae is a tribe of flies in the family Phoridae.

Genera
Acanthophorides Borgmeier, 1924
Acontistoptera Brues, 1902
Apocephalus Coquillett, 1901
Auxanommatidia Borgmeier, 1924
Cataclinusa Schmitz, 1927
Chonocephalus Wandolleck, 1898
Commoptera Brues, 1901
Cremersia Schmitz, 1924
Dacnophora Borgmeier, 1961
Diocophora Borgmeier, 1959
Ecitomyia Brues, 1901
Ecitoptera Borgmeier & Schmitz, 1923
Gymnophora Macquart, 1835
Kerophora Brown, 1988
Lecanocerus Borgmeier, 1962
Megaselia Rondani, 1856
Melaloncha Brues, 1903
Menozziola Schmitz, 1927
Metopina Macquart, 1835
Microselia Schmitz, 1934
Myrmosicarius Borgmeier, 1928
Neodohrniphora Malloch, 1914
Pericyclocera Schmitz, 1927
Phalacrotophora Enderlein, 1912
Phymatopterella Brues, 1933
Physoptera Borgmeier, 1958
Pseudacteon Coquillett, 1907
Puliciphora Dahl, 1897
Rhyncophoromyia Malloch, 1923
Stenophorina Borgmeier, 1963
Styletta Borgmeier, 1960
Syneura Brues, 1903
Trophithauma Schmitz, 1925
Trophodeinus Borgmeier, 1960
Xanionotum Brues, 1902

References

Phoridae
Diptera tribes